Hitit University is a university in Çorum, Turkey, founded in 2006. The university was affiliated to Gazi University before splitting into an independent university, with existing educational units affiliated to this newly founded university in 2006.

Hitit University comprises three institutes, eight faculties, two schools and seven vocational schools. The university provides education to 6,263 short cycle students, 8,245 bachelor students, 1,214 master's degree students and 116 PhD students through 592 academic staff and 347 administrative staff.

Academic units

Faculties
Faculty of Arts and Sciences
 Archaeology
 Ancient Languages and Cultures
 Anthropology
 Art History
 Biology
 Chemistry
 History
 Mathematics
 Molecular Biology and Genetics
 Physics
 Psychology
 Sociology
 Turkish Language and Literature
 Western Languages and Literature
Faculty of Economics and Administrative Sciences
 Banking and Finance 
 Business Management
 Economics
 International Trade and Logistics
 International Relations
 Public Finance
 Political Science and Public Administration
 Management of Health Institutions

Faculty of Divinity
 Basic Islamic Sciences 
 Islamic History and Arts
 Philosophy and Religion Sciences
 Elementary Religion and Morals Education
Faculty of Engineering
 Chemical Engineering
 Civil Engineering
 Computer Engineering
 Electrical and Electronic Engineering
 Food Engineering
 Industrial Engineering
 Mechanical Engineering
 Metallurgy and Materials Engineering
 Polymer Engineering

Faculty of Medicine
 Surgical Medicine Sciences
 Internal Medicine Sciences
 Basic Medicine Sciences
Faculty of Fine Arts, Design and Architecture
 Architecture
 Art
 Art and Design
 Ceramics
 Music
 Plastic Arts
 Textile and Fashion Design
 Graphic Design
 Interior Architecture and Environmental Design
 Visual Communication Design
 Industrial Design
 Landscape Architecture

Faculty of Veterinary Medicine

Faculty of Tourism

Institutes

Institute of Social Sciences
 Archeology
 History
 Business Management
 Economics
 Basic Islamic Sciences
 Islamic History and Arts
 Philosophy and Religion Sciences
 Physical Education and Sports
 Political Science and Public Administration
 Political and Social Sciences

Doctorate Programs
 Business Management
 Economics
 Basic Islamic Sciences
 Philosophy and Religion Sciences
 Physical Education and Sports

Institute of Science
 Biology
 Chemistry
 Physics
 Mathematics
 Chemical Engineering
 Mechanical Engineering
 Food Engineering

Doctorate Programs
 Mechanical Engineering
 Chemical Engineering

Institute of Health Sciences

Schools
 Physical Education and Sports School
 Coaching Education
 Physical Education and Sports
 Recreation
 Sport Management
 Health School
 Child Development
 Nursing
 Nutrition and Dietetics
 Physiotherapy and Rehabilitation
 Social Services

Vocational Schools
 Vocational School of Technical Sciences 
 Vocational School of Social Sciences
 İskilip Vocational School
 Osmancık Ömer Derindere Vocational School
 Sungurlu Vocational School
 Alaca Vocational School
 Health Services Vocational School

Academic Research and Application Centers 
 Alternative Energy Systems and Biomedical Application and Research Center
 Aquaculture and Water Sports Application and Research Center
 Black Sea Archaeology Application and Research Center
 Continuing Education Application and Research Center
 Distance Learning Application and Research Center
 Food Product Safety and Agricultural Application and Research Center
 Hacı Bektaş-ı Veli Application and Research Center
 Hittite Civilization Application and Research Center
 Scientific and Technical Application and Research Center
 Women and Family Affairs Application and Research Center
 Experimental Consumer Research and Application Center

Hitit University Library 
The library offers computer-supported services.

Hitit University library collection
 Printed publication 46,035
 e-Journal 43,700
 E-Book 155,924
 Periodicals 1,178
 Databases 50

The Yordam Library Automation System enables the users to scan the university catalogue or use online databases through the Hitit University webpage without going to the library.

The library enables visually-disabled students to benefit from printed material by scanning via Eye-Pal scanning system, with the pages read to them by means of Jaws 13 program and 689 audio books. Two computers are allocated to the visually-disabled students and assigned staffs provide them with guidance. The visually-disabled students can access thousands of audio books within the scope of protocol between Hitit University and Boğaziçi University Laboratory for Individuals with Visual Disabilities (GETEM).

Academic research journals 
The university publishes biannual journals: 
 The Journal of Divinity Faculty of Hitit University, first published in 2002, is a refereed academic journal including academic studies on Islam, world religions, theology, and social sciences related to those fields. 
 The Journal of Hitit University Social Sciences Institute is a refereed journal which has been published since 2008, 
 Hünkar the Journal of Academic Researches of Alevism Bektashism is an internationally refereed journal published by Hacı Bektaş-ı Veli Application and Research Center, 
 Hittite Journal of Science & Engineering is an international, peer-reviewed, multidisciplinary journal containing original research papers, review articles, short communications and letters in English.

International vision 
The university carries out student exchange programs and projects, international academic collaborations, conferences and events worldwide. Having been involved in the Erasmus Programme and the Mevlana program, Hitit University has opened an opportunity to widen transnational cooperation between higher education institutions by promoting mobility for students and teaching staff.

With the aim of improving recognition, the departments of Mechanical Engineering and Chemical Engineering of Hitit University Faculty of Engineering were accredited by Association for Evaluation and Accreditation of Engineering Programs (MÜDEK).

An international symposium on Meskhetian Turks in the 70th Year of Exile was hosted by Hitit University with the attendance of national and international participants on 14–15 November 2014. Additionally, the 4th International Turkish World Economic Forum was organized with the collaboration of the University of Foreign Languages and Professional Career and Hitit University in 7–9 May 2015. Moreover, Hitit University hosted the 12th World University Wrestling Championships (WUC) between the dates of 25–30 October 2016 and the European Universities Futsal Championship (Futsal’2017).

Student life 
During the annual Spring Fest of the university, concerts, dance performances, folk dance shows, and contests are organized. Hitit University has four indoor and nine outdoor sports facilities, for handball, basketball, volleyball, and football teams. Sports activities such as table-tennis, court tennis, fitness, cross country and wrestling are also performed. The university has 83 student clubs.

References

External links 
 

Universities and colleges in Turkey
2006 establishments in Turkey
Educational institutions established in 2006
Çorum